These hits topped the Dutch Top 40 in 1966.

See also
1966 in music

References

1966 in the Netherlands
1966 record charts
1966